The Galatheoidea are a superfamily of decapod crustaceans comprising the porcelain crabs and some squat lobsters. Squat lobsters within the three families of the superfamily Chirostyloidea are not closely related to the squat lobsters within the Galatheoidea. The fossil record of the superfamily extends back to the Middle Jurassic genus Palaeomunidopsis.

Classification

These families and genera are included:

Galatheidae Samouelle, 1819
† Acanthogalathea Müller & Collins, 1991 – Upper Eocene
 Alainius Baba, 1991
 Allogalathea Baba, 1969
 Allomunida Baba, 1988
 Coralliogalathea Baba & Javed, 1974
 Fennerogalathea Baba, 1988
 Galathea Fabricius, 1793
 Janetogalathea Baba & Wicksten, 1997
 Lauriea Baba, 1971
† Lessinigalathea De Angeli & Garassino, 2002 – Lower Eocene
† Lophoraninella Glaessner, 1945 – Upper Cretaceous
† Luisogalathea Karasawa & Hayakawa, 2000 – Upper Cretaceous
 Macrothea Macpherson & Cleva, 2010
† Mesogalathea Houša, 1963 – Upper Jurassic to Cretaceous
 Nanogalathea Tirmizi & Javed, 1980
† Palaeomunida Lőrenthey, 1901 – Upper Jurassic to Oligocene
 Phylladiorhynchus Baba, 1969
† Spathagalathea De Angeli & Garassino, 2002 – Upper Eocene

Munididae Ahyong et al., 2010
 Agononida Baba & de Saint Laurent, 1996
 Anomoeomunida Baba, 1993
 Anoplonida Baba & de Saint Laurent, 1996
 Babamunida Cabezas, Macpherson & Machordom, 2008
 Bathymunida Balss, 1914
 Cervimunida Benedict, 1902
† Cretagalathea Garassino, De Angeli & Pasini, 2008 – Upper Cretaceous
 Crosnierita Macpherson, 1998
 Enriquea Baba, 2005
 Heteronida Baba & de Saint Laurent, 1996
 Sadayoshia Baba, 1969
 Munida Leach, 1820
 Neonida Baba & de Saint Laurent, 1996
 Onconida Baba & de Saint Laurent, 1996
 Paramunida Baba, 1988
 Pleuroncodes Stimpson, 1860
 Plesionida Baba & de Saint Laurent, 1996
† Protomunida Beurlen, 1930 – Paleocene to Eocene
 Raymunida Macpherson & Machordom, 2000
 Setanida Macpherson, 2006
 Tasmanida Ahyong, 2007
 Torbenella Baba, 2008

Munidopsidae Ortmann, 1898
† Brazilomunida Martins-Neto, 2001 – Upper Cretaceous
† Calteagalathea De Angeli & Garassino, 2006 – Upper Cretaceous
† Eomunidopsis Vía Boada, 1981 – Upper Jurassic to Upper Cretaceous
† Faxegalathea Jakobsen & Collins, 1997 – Lower Paleocene
 Galacantha A. Milne-Edwards, 1880
† Gastrosacus von Meyer, 1851 – Upper Jurassic to Cretaceous
 Leiogalathea Baba, 1969
 Munidopsis Whiteaves, 1874
† Munitheities Lőrentheyin Lőrenthey& Beurlen, 1929 – Upper Jurassic
† Palaeomunidopsis Van Straelen, 1925 – Middle Jurassic
† Paragalathea Patrulius, 1960 – Upper Jurassic to Cretaceous
 Shinkaia Baba & Williams, 1998

Porcellanidae Haworth, 1825
 Aliaporcellana Nakasone & Miyake, 1969
 Allopetrolisthes Haig, 1960
 Ancylocheles Haig, 1978
† Annieporcellana Fraaije, Van Bakel, Jagt & Artal, 2008
† Beripetrolisthes De Angeli & Garassino, 2002
 Capilliporcellana Haig, 1978
 Clastotoechus Haig, 1960
 Enosteoides Johnson, 1970
† Eopetrolisthes De Angeli & Garassino, 2002
 Euceramus Stimpson, 1860
 Eulenaios Ng & Nakasone, 1993
 Heteropolyonyx Osawa, 2001
 Heteroporcellana Haig, 1978
 Liopetrolisthes Haig, 1960
 Lissoporcellana Haig, 1978
† Lobipetrolisthes De Angeli & Garassino, 2002
† Longoporcellana Müller & Collins, 1991
 Madarateuchus Harvey, 1999
 Megalobrachium Stimpson, 1858
 Minyocerus Stimpson, 1858
 Neopetrolisthes Miyake, 1937
 Neopisosoma Haig, 1960
 Novorostrum Osawa, 1998
 Orthochela Glassell, 1936
 Pachycheles Stimpson, 1858
 Parapetrolisthes Haig, 1962
 Petrocheles Miers, 1876
 Petrolisthes Stimpson, 1858
 Pisidia Leach, 1820
 Polyonyx Stimpson, 1858
 Porcellana Lamarck, 1801
 Porcellanella White, 1852
† Porcellanoidea C.-H. Hu & Tao, 1996
 Pseudoporcellanella Sankarankutty, 1961
 Raphidopus Stimpson, 1858
 Ulloaia Glassell, 1938

Fossil record
Two further fossil taxa may be included in the superfamily, but were not considered in the latest synopsis. The family Retrorsichelidae contains the single species, Retrorsichela laevis from the Campanian, which was tentatively placed in Galatheoidea by its authors. The Eocene genus Ovocarcinus, containing only O. elongatus, was originally placed incertae sedis.

See also
Chirostyloidea, the other superfamily of squat lobsters

References

Anomura
Middle Jurassic first appearances
Arthropod superfamilies